Face To Face is the sixth studio album by American gospel/soul singer Cissy Houston, released in 1996 on the House of Blues Music distributed by BMG. The album features the spiritual anthems "Amazing Grace" and "Go Where I Send Thee", as well as gospel version of Holland-Dozier's "How Sweet It Is (To Be Loved by You)". Houston co-arranged and co-produced the album, as well as writing six of the album's tracks. Her son, singer Gary Houston contributed backing vocals on the song "God Don't Ever Change".

Houston received a Grammy Award in 1997 for Best Traditional Gospel Album of 1996.

Track listing

Personnel
Arranged By – Jimmy Vivino (tracks: 1), Ouida W. Harding (tracks: 3, 12)
Arranged By, Producer, Vocals – Cissy Houston
Engineer, Mixed By, Producer – Joel Moss
Vocals – Gary Houston (tracks: 1)
Bass – Will Lee
Choir – Angelisa Guilford, Anita Jackson, Emma Davis, Gary Houston, Ingrid Arthur, Irma Harding, Kim Smith, LaTasha Spencer, Pamela Zimmerman, Patricia Houston, Ray Gordon, Raymond Kevin Alford, Robert E. Alston, Rochelle Foster, Sharon Thomas, Shirley Ullah, Stewart Ross, Tawanna Choice, Teresa Gattison, Vera Hubbard
Drums – Steve Jordan
Edited By, Mastered By – Ric Wilson 
Engineer [Assistant] – Glen Marchese, Kevin Leonard, Kurt Lundvall, Rich Weingart, Tom Hardisty
Guitar – Jimmy Vivino
Organ – Leon Pendarvis, Rudy Copeland
Percussion – Steve Forman
Piano, Organ – Ouida W. Harding

Credits
Recorded at Hit Factory, NY & BKB Studio, NJ. 
Mixed at Signet Sound, Hollywood CA. 
Edited & mastered at DigiSonics, Tarzana, CA

House of Blues Music Co., BMG Distribution

References

External links
Face To Face-Cissy Houston
Cissy Houston Bio

1996 albums
Cissy Houston albums